Admiral Rock is a community`in the Canadian province of Nova Scotia, located in the Municipal District of East Hants. It is named after Admiral Alexander Cochrane.

References

 Admiral Rock on Destination Nova Scotia

Communities in Hants County, Nova Scotia